Ekaterina Rogovaya (born 7 October 1995) is a Russian professional racing cyclist. In October 2019, she won the gold medal in the women's team sprint event at the 2019 UEC European Track Championships.

References

1995 births
Living people
Russian female cyclists
Place of birth missing (living people)
Cyclists at the 2019 European Games
European Games medalists in cycling
European Games gold medalists for Russia
21st-century Russian women